Filatov Lug is a Moscow Metro station on the Sokolnicheskaya line. It was opened on 20 June 2019, as part of an extension that included Kommunarka, Prokshino, and Olkhovaya.

References 

Sokolnicheskaya Line
Moscow Metro stations
Railway stations in Russia opened in 2019